Fu Jing may refer to:
 Fu Jing (Shang dynasty)
 Fu Jing (singer)